Wyndham Clark (born December 9, 1993) is an American professional golfer from Denver, Colorado who currently plays on the PGA Tour.

Amateur career
Clark attended Valor Christian High School in Highlands Ranch, Colorado, where he was classmates with NFL player Christian McCaffrey. In high school he twice won the Colorado state championship and was named player of the year in 2011. He initially enrolled at Oklahoma State in 2012, finishing in ninth place at the 2012 U.S. Amateur. He transferred to Oregon in 2016, winning the Pac-12 conference championship and GolfWeek Player of the Year. He graduated with a business degree in 2017.

Professional career
Clark finished in a tie for 23rd at Web.com Tour qualifying in 2017, earning his card for the 2018 season. He made 24 starts that season with four top-10 finishes. By finishing 16th on the tour money list, he qualified for the PGA Tour for the 2018–19 season.

Clark had his best finish of his PGA Tour career at the Bermuda Championship in 2020, losing a playoff to PGA Tour veteran Brian Gay to finish alone in second place.

Personal life
Clark currently resides in Las Vegas, Nevada. His mother died from breast cancer while he was attending Oklahoma State.

Amateur wins
2009 Colorado State Championship
2011 Colorado State Championship
2017 Pac-12 Championship

Playoff record
PGA Tour playoff record (0–1)

Results in major championships
Results not in chronological order in 2020.

CUT = missed the half-way cut
"T" = tied
NT = No tournament due to COVID-19 pandemic

Results in The Players Championship

CUT = missed the halfway cut
"T" indicates a tie for a place
DQ = disqualified
C = Canceled after the first round due to the COVID-19 pandemic

U.S. national team appearances
Amateur
Palmer Cup: 2014

See also
2018 Web.com Tour Finals graduates

References

External links
 
 
 Oregon profile

American male golfers
Oregon Ducks men's golfers
Oklahoma State Cowboys golfers
PGA Tour golfers
Korn Ferry Tour graduates
Golfers from Denver
1993 births
Living people